Don Mueang Station is a railway station in Bangkok. It is located opposite Don Mueang International Airport. It currently serves the SRT Dark Red Line and long-distance intercity trains on the Northern and Northeastern Line of the State Railway of Thailand. There is a pedestrian bridge directly linking the new station to the airport.

History 
Don Mueang station opened in 1898 as part of Thailand's first railway between Bangkok and Ayutthaya. Its initial station structure was located on the airport side. However, this was moved after the construction of Vibhavadi Rangsit Road. A new station structure was constructed in 2013 in corcordance with the construction of the SRT Dark Red Line. This new elevated station structure is located 700 meters from the original station, above the site of the former Talat Mai Don Mueang railway halt. There are two levels, whereby the lower four platforms are for long-distance intercity and commuter trains, while the upper four platforms are for the SRT Dark Red Line.

Dark Red Line services began running from the elevated station on 2 August 2021. Long distance trains started operating from the elevated station on 19 January 2023, with the at-grade station closing on the same day.

Station layout

Gallery

References 

Railway stations in Bangkok
Airport Rail Link (Bangkok) stations
Airport railway stations in Thailand
SRT Red Lines